Jamie McCoy (born July 21, 1987)  is a former American football tight end and fullback.

College career
He played college football at Texas A&M.

Professional career

St. Louis Rams
On April 25, 2010, he was signed with the St. Louis Rams as an undrafted free agent. He was released on August 29, 2010.

Pittsburgh Steelers
In 2011, he signed with Pittsburgh Steelers.

San Diego Chargers
On December 26, 2012 McCoy signed with the San Diego Chargers.

References

Living people
American football fullbacks
American football tight ends
Pittsburgh Steelers players
1987 births
Texas A&M Aggies football players
People from Midland, Texas
Players of American football from Texas